The 2018–19 Omaha Mavericks women's basketball team represents the University of Nebraska Omaha during the 2018–19 NCAA Division I women's basketball season. The Mavericks, led by third year head coach Brittany Lange, play their home games at Baxter Arena and were members of The Summit League. They finished the season 8–21, 2–14 in Summit League play to finish in last place. They failed to qualify for the Summit League women's tournament.

Roster

Schedule

|-
!colspan=9 style=| Exhibition

|-
!colspan=9 style=| Regular season

See also
 2018–19 Omaha Mavericks men's basketball team

References

Omaha Mavericks women's basketball seasons
Omaha
2018 in sports in Nebraska
2019 in sports in Nebraska